Theo Trebs (born 6 September 1994) is a German actor, best known for his feature film roles as Ferdinand in the World War I period film The White Ribbon (2009), and as Felix in the dramatic soccer film Lessons of a Dream (2011).

Biography 
Trebs lives in a family with five children. His mother, Dorothea Trebs, is a talent agent, and his siblings Enno, Lilli, Nele, and Pepe are also young German actors. Trebs previously played supporting roles in Lilly the Witch – The Dragon and the Magic Book (2008); Krupp – A German Family (2008), as Alfried Krupp (aged 10–13 years); and as Ferdinand in Michael Haneke's award-winning historical drama The White Ribbon (2009). In 2010 he appeared in Rammbock and in the television crime series Inspektor Barbarotti – Mensch ohne Hund. In 2011 he appeared as Felix Hartung in the soccer-themed dramatic film, Lessons of a Dream, which earned him a Young Artist Award nomination as "Best Leading Young Actor in an International Feature Film".

In his spare time, he is active in sports, especially as sailor in a youth class (29er).

Filmography

Awards

References

External links 

 Theo Trebs Agentur Kokon

1994 births
Living people
German male film actors
German male television actors
Male actors from Berlin